Urban Theatre Projects (Utp), previously known as Death Defying Theatre (DDT), is a theatre company based in Bankstown Sydney, Australia. Urban Theatre Projects works with marginalised voices across multiple platforms to re-imagine what theatre can be and who it can be for.  Through assistance in artistic development and research, Utp creates essential opportunities for diverse artists to engage with diverse audiences via projects that stimulate urgent conversations and impactful outcomes.

Early History

1979-1989 
Urban Theatre Projects’ (Utp) history is built on the unceded lands of the First Nations people.

The organisation started as a street theatre company in 1979 by graduates of the University of New South Wales. The project was founded by Paul Brown, Alice Spizzo, Christine Sammers, and Kim Spinks. Initially, their office was located in the Village Church Centre (VCC) in the Paddington area of the Eastern Suburbs. The company mostly rehearsed outdoors in the nearby Centennial Park. In the late 1980s, the group was based in the Bondi Pavilion.
In 1991, the group moved from Eastern Sydney to the Auburn area of Western Sydney, and in 1997, the group changed its name to Urban Theatre Projects.

The group initially emphasized political theatre. The group was instrumental in moderating what constituted theatre practice in Australia in the 1980s. As a way of reaching a new constituency in its early years, a collective of young performance-makers made work on the streets, later shifting to art in working life processes, placing artists in working sites such as mining towns (Coal Town, 1984) and factories (Behind the Seams, 1988).

1990-2000 
In the early 90s the company moved to Western Sydney where communities became the performers as well as an essential part of the devising process, such as Café Hakawati (1991), a collaboration with Arabic-speaking communities at the time of the first Gulf War. Utp began creating site-specific intimate spectacles, intersecting community cultural development and contemporary performance practice. Under the artistic direction of Fiona Winning and John Baylis, notable works included Hip Hopera (1995), Trackwork (1997), Speed St (1999) and Asylum (2001).

A succession of leading Australian artists has enabled the company to remain at the forefront of ground breaking new processes that have led to seminal theatre works, mapping the shifting dynamics of urban life and artistic development over three decades of contemporary Australia.

Current 
The philosophy and artists of Urban Theatre Projects have driven an investigation of new forms, new collaborations and new contexts, consistently challenging and reinvigorating art form practice.

Utp plays a vital role in Australia's cultural landscape, producing 115+ works of national cultural significance and continuing to nurture the voices of the future. Many renowned Australian artists made their first work with Utp; Roslyn Oades, Khalid Sabsabi and Michael Mohammed Ahmad to name just a few. Utp has received numerous awards, including a Sidney Myer Award that recognises the company's long-standing contribution to theatre.

Under Alicia Talbot's Artistic Directorship (2001–2012) a new brand of work propelled the company into an exciting phase of growth, extending its profile and reputation nationally and internationally. Talbot shifted the model of community engagement to position community members as expert consultants. As such, they were invited to share opinions and observations about the world as they perceived it. This process grounded Talbot's projects with an authenticity that blurred the line between theatrical artifice and everyday life. om 2006–2012 the Company premiered 4 large-scale works as part of The Sydney Festival; Back Home (2006), The Last Highway (2008), The Fence (2010) and most recently Buried City (2012), a co-production with Sydney Festival and Belvoir Street Theatre.

Since 2014, Artistic director Rosie Dennis significantly increased the company's program, expanding to digital platforms (producing the company's first film Bre & Back), and shifting to a curatorial model while maintaining an artist-led culture and branding work with her distinctive exuberance and sensitivity. Her works as Director include: Home Country (Sydney Festival 2017), Simple Infinity (2016), One Day for Peace (2015), My Radio Heart (2014) and Life As We Know It (2013), while her work as Curator includes BANKSTOWN:LIVE (Sydney Festival 2015), One Day for Peace (2016), Blak Box (2018), Talk Show (2018) and RIGHT HERE. RIGHT NOW. (2018).

Dr Jessica Olivieri is the current Artistic Director, bringing with her a strong connection to Western Sydney artists and communities. Jessica will continue the RIGHT HERE. RIGHT NOW. festival model, as well as working with Daniel Browning to continue to grow Blak Box and other First Nations programs. Two new programming streams that Jessica is bringing to Utp are CAUCUS, a research-based development stream with academics, artists and community and ACCESS, a focus on artists who have a relationship with disability.

Members 
Paul Brown, one of the group's co-founders, later went on to become a professor of earth sciences at the University of New South Wales.

Julia Cotton, the former Head of Movement Studies at the National Institute of Dramatic Art (NIDA), worked on productions for the group.

Dr Robert Lang, a member of the Fellow of Australian Institute of Company Directors, current chair person for Utp.

References 

Theatre companies in Australia
Theatre in Sydney